Qualifying for the 2023 Rugby World Cup for North and South America began in June 2021, with seven teams competing for two direct qualification spots into the final tournament and for one place in the Final Qualification Tournament.

For the first time since 2003 the Americas qualification process combined both North and South America to determine who qualifies as Americas. This is in different to past years where Americas 1 was a default winner between a play-off series between Canada and USA.

Format
Qualifying began with two elimination matches between the bottom four ranked teams in South Americas; Brazil and Paraguay, and Chile and Colombia. The winners of this round moved on to join Uruguay in Round 2 in the 2021 South American Rugby Championship.

Round 2 was used to decide the winners of the North American region, a Canada vs USA play-off series, and the winners of the South American region, the 2021 Americas Rugby Championship. The winning sides, USA and Uruguay, then progressed to an Americas 1 decider to earn the right to qualify for the World Cup as Americas 1.

The runner-ups of the Regional matches then advanced to an Americas 2 repechage match with the winner of the repechage play-off matches, progressing to an Americas 2 play-off series against the loser of the Americas 1 play-off series.

The winner of this final match qualified as Americas 2, while the loser moved on to the Final Qualification Tournament as Americas 3.

Entrants
Seven teams competed during the Americas qualifiers for the 2023 Rugby World Cup.

The Rugby Americas North entrants were reduced to just the United States and Canada, as holding the RAN Championship in 2020 and 2021 was not possible due to the COVID-19 pandemic.

Team World rankings taken prior to the first Americas qualifying match.

Teams in bold have previously competed in a Rugby World Cup.

Round 1: South American qualifiers
Round 1 saw the four bottom-ranked teams in South America play-off for a qualification spot in the South American Championship to advance to Round 3 or 4 to earn the right to qualify as Americas 1 or 2. Brazil, Chile, Colombia, and Paraguay were seeded 1–4 (based on their World Rugby Rankings), where seed 1 would face seed 4 and seed 2 would face seed 3. Brazil (26) were seeded as 1, Chile (29) as 2, Colombia (33) as 3, and Paraguay (46) as 4. Brazil and Chile as the higher-ranked teams got home advantage.

The two winners from this round advanced to Round 2.

Game 1

Game 2

 Game cancelled on 2 July 2021 due to COVID-19 cases in the Colombian team. Chile progressed to the next round as a result.

Round 2: Regional Deciders

Round 2A: 2021 South American Championship
Round 2A saw the South American winner decided and advanced to Round 3 to earn the right to qualify for the World Cup as Americas 1 whilst the runners-up progress to Round 4 for an Americas 2 repechage play-off series to advance to Round 5 to earn the right to compete for a position as Americas 2.

All South American qualifying matches were held in Montevideo due to the COVID-19 pandemic.

Round 2B: Canada v United States play-off series
Round 2B decided North America 1 and advanced the United States to Round 3 to earn the right to compete for Americas 1. The runner-up (Canada as North America 2) progresses to an Americas 2 Repechage play-off match to face South America 2, Chile to decide who advances to the final stage of the Americas qualification process to earn the right to qualify as Americas 2.

This round saw the United States and Canada face off in a home-and-away play-off series, with the United States winning on aggregate 59–50.

|-

|}

Notes:
 Mason Flesch, Jason Higgins, Spencer Jones, and Brock Webster (all Canada) and Tavite Lopeti (United States) made their international debuts.
 Canada defeated the United States for the first time since their 13–11 win in 2013.

Round 3: Americas 1 decider
Round 3 saw Americas 1 decided, where North America 1 faced South America 1 in a home-and-away play-off series to earn the top spot from the Americas region. The runner-up by default got a second chance at qualification by moving to Round 5: Americas 2 play-off. On 9 October 2021, Uruguay qualified as Americas 1, winning the series 50–34 on aggregate.

|-

|}

Notes:
 Moni Tonga’uiha (United States) made his international debut.

Notes:
 Uruguay qualify for the Rugby World Cup as Americas 1 for the first time.
 This was Uruguay's biggest winning margin over the United States.
 Benjamín Bonasso (United States) made his international debut.

Round 4: Americas 2 Repechage
Round 4 saw the runner-up of Round 2A (South America 2) play-off against the loser of Round 2B (North America 2) in a home and away play-off series to decide who progresses to the Americas 2 qualifier. On 9 October 2021, Chile progressed to the next round, beating Canada 54–46 on aggregate. As a result, Canada failed to reach a Rugby World Cup for the first time in history.

|-

|}

Notes:
 This was Chile's first ever victory over Canada.

Round 5: Americas 2 qualifier
The winner of Round 5, Chile, qualified for the World Cup as Americas 2. The loser, United States, advanced to the Final Qualification Tournament as Americas 3.

|-

|}

Notes:
 Diego Escobar (Chile) and Jason Damm (United States) made their international debuts.

Notes:
 Chile qualify for their first Rugby World Cup on aggregate score, 52–51.
 This was Chile's first away win over the United States and their first since 2002.

See also
 2023 Rugby World Cup – Regional play-off and Final Qualification Tournament
South American Rugby Championship
Rugby Americas North Championship
Rugby Americas North
Sudamerica Rugby

References

Notes

External links
 Rugby World Cup Official Site

Americas qualification
2023